The Ministry of Science and ICT (MSIT) is a ministry of the government of South Korea. It succeeded the former Ministry of Science, ICT and Future Planning.

The headquarters was originally in Gwacheon, Gyeonggi-do before relocating to Sejong City in 2019 with new buildings constructed in 2021.

References

External links

 Ministry of Science and ICT
 Ministry of Science and ICT 

Science and ICT
South Korea
South Korea